Società Sportiva Dilettantistica Group Città di Castello (usually referred to as Group Castello) is an Italian association football club, based in Città di Castello, Umbria. Group Castello currently plays in Eccellenza.

History 
The club was founded in 1998.

The club in the season 2011–12 was relegated from Serie D to Eccellenza.

Squad

Managers 
The club is currently coached by Simone Pazzaglia.

Colors and badge 
The team's colors are white and red.

External links 
Official homepage

Football clubs in Umbria
Città di Castello
Association football clubs established in 1998
1998 establishments in Italy